Michael "Rocky" Fielding (born 5 August 1987) is a British former professional boxer. He held the WBA (Regular) super-middleweight title in 2018. At regional level, he held the Commonwealth super-middleweight title twice between 2013 and 2017, and the British super-middleweight title in 2017.

Biography
Born in Liverpool, Merseyside, Rocky was originally named Michael, but owing to his 10 lbs birth weight his father nicknamed him 'The Rock'.

Amateur career
Rocky started out boxing in Stockbridge ABC, as an amateur and reached the 2007 & 2008 ABA Light Heavyweight finals whilst boxing out of Rotunda ABC. He was unbeaten until he met Chris 'Big Mamma' Cook who knocked him out in 1 round.

Professional career

He turned professional in 2010 and after winning his first three professional bouts as a light heavyweight, Fielding was offered the chance to drop down a weight to take part in The Super Middleweight Prizefighter Series after Kenny Anderson pulled out at short notice. Fielding went on to win the tournament causing a stoppage in each of his three fights and becoming the first boxer in a Prizefighter series to do so.

On 6 October 2012, Fielding defeated Carl Dilks earning the vacant English Super Middleweight title. Rocky defended his English Super Middleweight title against Wayne Reed on the Bellew v Chelimba undercard, he dropped Reed three times in this fight and won via technical knockout in the 6th round. Next up was Polish fighter Michal Nieroda. Rocky completely dominated the fight. It ended in 59 seconds as Rocky landed several body shots sending down Nieroda for the 10 count.

On 21 September 2013, at The Liverpool Olympia, Rocky defeated Mohammed Akrong with a first round stoppage to win the vacant Commonwealth Super Middleweight Title. On 23 October 2013, Fielding defended his Commonwealth title against Luke Blackledge. Rocky knocked out Luke Blackledge with a left hook 2:32 into the 1st round, retaining his Commonwealth title.

On 7 November 2015 Fielding took on the highly rated Callum Smith at the Echo Arena in an all Liverpool affair but was defeated in the first round by a TKO. Fielding rebuilt his career with some good wins, and on 22 April 2017 beat John Ryder by a controversial split decision for the British title. Five months later Fielding defended the British title and regained the Commonwealth title, which had been lost on the scales a few years earlier, with a devastating first round knockout of the Scotsman David Brophy.

On 1 November 2017, it was announced that Fielding would fight Erik Skoglund for the WBC Silver Super Middleweight belt on the undercard of the rematch between David Haye and Tony Bellew. The event was scrapped after Haye suffered an injury.

Promoter Eddie Hearn of Matchroom, Fielding's promoter, announced he would challenge Tyron Zeuge for the WBA Super Middleweight World Title on 14 June 2018 in Offenburg, Germany. Despite entering the fight as an underdog, Fielding knocked Zeuge out in five rounds to win the WBA crown.

Following that, Fielding faced two-division champion Canelo Álvarez at Madison Square Garden on 15 December 2018. Eddie Hearn negotiated a deal with Canelo's promoter, Golden Boy Promotions, for the fight - as part of a historic $365million deal between Álvarez & DAZN. The fight was the first defense of the WBA belt for Fielding, with Álvarez stepping up a weight class from middleweight to challenge Fielding for his title. Álvarez floored Fielding in the first, second and third rounds before the referee waved the contest off.

Fielding's next fight came on 15 November 2019, against Abdallah Paziwapazi. Fielding won the fight within two rounds, after dropping Paziwapazi with a vicious left hook in the second.

Professional boxing record

{|class="wikitable" style="text-align:center
|-
!
!Result
!Record
!Opponent
!Type
!Round, time
!Date
!Location
!Notes
|-
|33
|Loss
|30–3
|style="text-align:left;"|Dan Azeez
|TKO
|8 (12), 
|17 Dec 2022
|style="text-align:left;"|
|style="text-align:left;"|
|-
|32
|Win
|30–2
|align=left|Timo Laine
|TKO
|3 (8), 
|22 Apr 2022
|align=left|
|
|-
|31
|Win
|29–2
|align=left|Emmanuel Danso
|RTD
|2 (10), 
|Nov 26 2021
|align=left|
|
|-
|30
|Win
|28–2
|align=left|Abdallah Paziwapazi 
|KO
|2 (10), 
|Nov 15 2019
|align=left|
|
|-
|29
|Lost
|27–2
|align=left|Canelo Álvarez
|TKO
|3 (12), 
|Dec 15 2018
|align=left| 
|align=left| 
|- align=center
|28
|Win
|27–1
|align=left|Tyron Zeuge
|TKO
|5 (12), 
|Jul 14 2018
|align=left| 
|align=left| 
|- align=center
|27
|Win
|26–1
|align=left|Karel Horejšek
|PTS
|8
|Mar 3 2018
|align=left|
|
|- align=center
|26
|Win
|25–1
|align=left|David Brophy
|TKO
|1 (12), 
|Sep 30 2017
|align=left|
|align=left|
|-align=center
|25
|Win
|24–1
|align=left|John Ryder
|SD
|12
|Apr 22 2017
|align=left|
|align=left|
|-
|-align=center
|24
|Win
|23–1
|align=left|Istvan Zeller
|TKO
|2 (8), 
|Oct 15 2016
|align=left|
|
|-align=center
|23
|Win
|22–1
|align=left|Christopher Rebrassé
|SD
|12
|Apr 2 2016
|align=left|
|align=left|
|- align=center
|22
|Loss
|21–1
|align=left|Callum Smith
|TKO
|1 (12), 
|Nov 7 2015
|align=left|
|align=left|
|- align=center
|21
|Win
|21–0
|align=left|Brian Vera
|TKO
|2 (12), 
|Jun 26 2015
|align=left|
|align=left|
|-align=center
|-align=center
|20
|Win
|20–0
|align=left|Olegs Fedotovs
|PTS
|8
|Mar 7 2015
|align=left|
|align=left|
|-align=center
|19
|Win
|19–0
|align=left|Noe Gonzalez Alcoba
|TKO
|5 (12), 
|Jul 12 2014
|align=left|
|align=left|
|-align=center
|18
|Win
|18–0
|align=left|Charles Adamu
|UD
|12
|Mar 15 2014
|align=left|
|align=left|
|-align=center
|17
|Win
|17–0
|align=left|Luke Blackledge
|KO
|1 (12), 
|Nov 23 2013
|align=left|
|align=left|
|-align=center
|16
|Win
|16–0
|align=left|Mohammed Akrong
|TKO
|1 (12), 
|Sep 21 2013
|align=left|
|align=left|
|-align=center
|15
|Win
|15–0
|align=left|Darren McKenna
|PTS
|4
|Jul 13 2013
|align=left|
|align=left|
|-align=center
|14
|Win
|14–0
|align=left|Michal Nieroda
|KO
|1 (8), 
|May 11, 2013
|align=left|
|align=left|
|-align=center
|13
|Win
|13–0
|align=left|Wayne Reed
|TKO
|6 (10), 
|Mar 30 2013
|align=left|
|align=left|
|- align=center
|12
|Win
|12–0
|align=left|Carl Dilks
|TKO
|5 (10), 
|Oct 6 2012
|align=left|
|style="text-align:left;"|
|-align=center
|11 
|Win
|11–0
|align=left|Ferenc Hafner
|TKO
|1 (6), 
|Jul 7 2012 
|align=left|
|align=left|
|-align=center
|10
|Win
|10–0
|align=left|Ciaran Healy
|RTD
|3 (6), 
|May 18, 2012
|align=left|
|align=left|
|-align=center
|9
|Win
|9–0
|align=left|Tommy Tolan
|PTS
|6
|Oct 15 2011
|align=left|
|align=left|
|-align=center
|8
|Win
|8–0
|align=left|Paul Morby
|PTS
|6
|Sep 17 2011
|align=left|
|align=left|
|-align=center
|7
|Win
|7–0
|align=left|Jamie Ambler
|PTS
|6
|Jul 16 2011
|align=left|
|align=left|
|-align=center
|6
|Win
|6–0
|align=left|Tobias Webb
|RTD
|2 (3), 
|Mar 23 2011
|align=left|
|align=left|
|-align=center
|5
|Win
|5–0
|align=left|Joe Ainscough
|TKO
|1 (3), 
|Mar 23 2011
|align=left|
|align=left|
|-align=center
|4
|Win
|4–0
|align=left|Patrick Maxwell
|TKO
|2 (3), 
|Mar 23 2011
|align=left|
|align=left|
|-align=center
|3
|Win
|3–0
|align=left|Phil Goodwin
|PTS
|4
|Feb 20 2011 
|align=left|
|align=left|
|-align=center
|2
|Win
|2–0
|align=left|Lee Duncan
|PTS
|6
|Nov 27 2010
|align=left|
|align=left|
|-align=center
|1
|Win
|1–0
|align=left|James Tucker
|PTS
|6
|Sep 25 2010
|align=left|
|
|-align=center

References

External links

Rocky Fielding - Profile, News Archive & Current Rankings at Box.Live

!colspan="3" style="background:#C1D8FF;"| Accomplishments
|- 
|  style="width:23%; text-align:center;"| Preceded byTyron Zeuge
|  style="width:52%; text-align:center;"| WBA super-middleweight championRegular title14 July – 15 December 2018
|  style="width:23%; text-align:center;"| Succeeded byCanelo Álvarez

1987 births
Living people
English male boxers
Boxers from Liverpool
Super-middleweight boxers
Light-heavyweight boxers